The Team event competition of the diving events at the 2015 World Aquatics Championships was held on 29 July 2015.

The mixed team competition, introduced for the first time in this edition of the championships, must include five dives. A dive must be performed by the female or the male from the trampoline of 1m, from the trampoline of 3m and from the platform each. The other two dives must be performed as mixed dives synchronized by the 1m springboard and the 3m springboard.

Results
The final was held at 19:30.

References

Team event
World Aquatics Championships